Dobrava ob Krki is a small village on the right bank of the Krka River east of Podbočje in the Municipality of Krško in eastern Slovenia. The area is part of the traditional region of Lower Carniola. It is now included with the rest of the municipality in the Lower Sava Statistical Region.

Name
The name of the settlement was changed from Dobrava to Dobrava ob Krki in 1953.

References

External links
Dobrava ob Krki on Geopedia

Populated places in the Municipality of Krško